Asko Autio (born 21 April 1953) is a Finnish cross-country skier. He competed in the 50 km event at the 1980 Winter Olympics.

Cross-country skiing results
All results are sourced from the International Ski Federation (FIS).

Olympic Games

World Championships

World Cup

Season standings

Individual podiums
1 victory
2 podiums

References

External links
 

1953 births
Living people
Finnish male cross-country skiers
Olympic cross-country skiers of Finland
Cross-country skiers at the 1980 Winter Olympics
People from Ylivieska
Sportspeople from North Ostrobothnia
20th-century Finnish people